"Go My Way" was the fourteenth Japanese single release from Hitomi Yaida. It is also the first single released from the album It's a New Day.

It reached number eleven in the charts on March 25, 2006.

The song "Go My Way" is covered in the rhythm games Moero! Nekketsu Rhythm Damashii Osu! Tatakae! Ouendan 2 for the Nintendo DS, and in GuitarFreaks V3 and DrumMania V3, released for arcades and for the PlayStation 2.

Track listing

Notes

2006 singles
Hitomi Yaida songs
Songs written by Hitomi Yaida
2006 songs